Mutual Friends is a British comedy drama television series broadcast in six episodes on BBC One in from 26 August until 30 September 2008. The series starred Marc Warren, Alexander Armstrong, Keeley Hawes, Sarah Alexander, Claire Rushbrook, Emily Joyce, Naomi Bentley and Joshua Sarphie as a group of old friends whose lives are thrown into chaos when one of their group commits suicide.

Synopsis
Marc Warren depicts a terminally useless solicitor Martin, whose life as a lawyer, husband to Jen (Keeley Hawes) and father to Dan (Joshua Sarphie) is thrown into turmoil as a consequence of his friends' various mid-life crises, starting with the suicide of his best friend Karl, who was guilt-ridden following his affair with Jen. Martin's other best friend, the suave, unreliable chancer Patrick (Alexander Armstrong), throws the situation into more chaos.

Cast 
Series cast summary:

Marc Warren as Martin Grantham - 6 episodes, 2008

Keeley Hawes as Jen Grantham - 6 episodes, 2008

Alexander Armstrong as Patrick Turner - 6 episodes, 2008

Claire Rushbrook as Leigh Cato - 6 episodes, 2008

Joshua Sarphie as Dan Grantham - 6 episodes, 2008

Sarah Alexander as Liz - 6 episodes, 2008

Rhashan Stone as Dev - 6 episodes, 2008

Naomi Bentley as Anita - 6 episodes, 2008

Lee Ross as Harry Seed - 6 episodes, 2008

Emily Joyce as Sarah - 6 episodes, 2008

Alistair Petrie as Carl Cato - 4 episodes, 2008

Thomas Byrne as Conor Cato - 4 episodes, 2008

Patric Knowles as James - 3 episodes, 2008

Ruben Crow as Tom - 2 episodes, 2008

Paul Thornley as Darren - 2 episodes, 2008

Karen Paullada as Policewoman - 2 episodes, 2008

Episodes

Production
Most of the show was filmed in Henley. Filming for the court scene in episode two was filmed in Bracknell in the summer of 2008 at Bracknell's police station.

The series was not recommissioned by the BBC due to low ratings. Anil Gupta also attributed the demise of the series to the departure of Peter Fincham, the controller of BBC One, in 2008.

Reception
The series was nominated for Best TV Comedy Drama at the British Comedy Awards 2008.

DVD release
The series has been released on a two-disc DVD set by 2 Entertain.

References

External links
 
Official press release at BBC Press Office

2008 British television series debuts
2008 British television series endings
BBC television dramas
British television miniseries
English-language television shows
British comedy-drama television shows
Television series by Hat Trick Productions
Television shows set in Oxfordshire
2000s British drama television series
Films directed by Catherine Morshead